Ean Lewis (born 25 February 1991) is a Belizean professional footballer who plays as a midfielder for the Belize national team.

International career
He debuted internationally on 8 September 2019, in a CONCACAF Nations League match against Grenada in a 1-2 defeat.

On 17 November 2019, Lewis scored his first goal for Belize against non-FIFA member French Guiana in a 2–0 victory.

References

External links
 
 

1991 births
Living people
Belizean footballers
Belize international footballers
Association football midfielders
Belize Defence Force FC players